Final league standings for the 1909-10 St. Louis Soccer League.

Overview
The weeks leading up to the 1909-10 season saw the arrival of the Pilgrims club from England.  This team, on a tour of the United States, played several games against local opponents.  The season began the first week of November 1909.  All games were played at Athletic Park which used to sit at the intersection of Garrison Avenue and Market Street.

League standings

References
St. Louis Soccer Leagues (RSSSF)
The Year in American Soccer - 1910

1909-10
1909–10 domestic association football leagues
1909–10 in American soccer
St Louis Soccer
St Louis Soccer